The twin-engine F5L was one of the Felixstowe F series of flying boats developed by John Cyril Porte at the Seaplane Experimental Station, Felixstowe, England, during the First World War for production in America.

A civilian version of the aircraft was known as the Aeromarine 75.

Design and development

Porte had taken the Curtiss H-12, an original design by the American Glenn Curtiss, and developed it into a practical series of flying boats at the Felixstowe station.  They then took their F.5 model and further redesigned it with better streamlining, a stronger hull using veneer instead of doped linen and U.S.-built 330 hp (later 400 hp) Liberty 12A engines. The prototype was built and tested in England and the design then taken over by the Naval Aircraft Factory, Philadelphia, where further modifications were made to suit their production methods under wartime conditions. The American-built version was also known as the Curtiss F5L and (in civilian operation) as the Aeromarine 75.

The F5L was built by the Naval Aircraft Factory (137), Curtiss (60) and Canadian Aeroplanes Limited (30). Some were converted for civilian use by the Aeromarine Plane and Motor Company in 1919.

Operational history
The F5L  entered U.S. service at the end of the war and was the U.S. Navy's standard patrol aircraft until 1928, when it was replaced by the PN-12. In civil service, named the Aeromarine 75, the Felixstowe F5L could accommodate 10 passengers and was operated by Aeromarine Airways on flights from Key West to Havana, carrying the first U.S. Post Office international air mail on flights from New York City to Atlantic City, and from Cleveland to Detroit.

Operators

Argentine Naval Aviation

Brazilian Naval Aviation – Curtiss F5L

United States Navy
Aeromarine Airways

Accidents and incidents

On 13 January 1923, the Aeromarine Airways Aeromarine 75 Columbus suffered engine failure during a flight from Key West to Havana and landed in the Florida Strait.  Buffeted by 10-to-15-foot (3-to-4.5-metre) waves, its hull began to fill with water. Four passengers died, but the ferry ship H. M. Flagler saved the other three passengers and both crew members.

Survivors
Both a hull and float from a US Navy F5L are preserved at the National Air and Space Museum (Smithsonian). The hull is only partially skinned with wood to reveal structure. Both artifacts are presently in storage and not available for public display.

Specifications

See also

References

Bibliography
 Bruce, J.M. "The Felixstowe Flying-Boats: Historic Military Aircraft No. 11 Part 1". Flight, 2 December 1955, pp. 842–846.
 Bruce, J.M. "The Felixstowe Flying-Boats: Historic Military Aircraft No. 11 Part 2". Flight, 16 December 1955, pp. 895–898.
 Bruce, J.M. "The Felixstowe Flying-Boats: Historic Military Aircraft No. 11 Part 3". Flight, 23 December 1955, pp. 929–932.
 Donald, David and Jon Lake, eds. Encyclopedia of World Military Aircraft. London: AIRtime Publishing, 1996. .
 
 Taylor, Michael J.H., ed. Jane's Encyclopedia of Aviation. London: Studio Editions, Ltd., 1989. .
 Thetford, Owen. Aircraft of the Royal Air Force since 1918. London: Putnam & Co., 1979. .
 "U.S.A. Navy F-5-L Flying Boat (PDF) (Contemporary technical description with photographs and drawings; first part of two-part article)". Flight, XI (31), No. 553, 31 July 1919, pp. 1024–1026. Retrieved: 4 February 2011.
 "U.S.A. Navy F-5-L Flying Boat (PDF)(Second part of two-part article)." Flight, XI (32), No. 554, 7 August 1919, pp. 1058–1062.  Retrieved: 4 February 2011.
 "An Aeromarine Limousine Flying Boat" (PDF). Flight, XII (32), No. 606, 5 August 1920, p. 865.

External links

 Canadian Aeroplanes Ltd : Photographs including the first Felixstowe F5L built by the factory.
 Canadian Aeroplanes Ltd: Photographs including construction and assembly of the first F5L built by the factory from 30 April 1918.
 Film of US Navy F5Ls flying in formation
 Film of US Navy F5Ls parked and sinking SMS Ostfriesland, July 1921
 Film of an F5L being maneuvered on a beaching trolley and other Curtiss types
 The Aeromarine Website

F.5L
1910s United States patrol aircraft
Flying boats
Curtiss aircraft
Naval Aircraft Factory aircraft
Biplanes
Aeromarine aircraft
Aircraft first flown in 1918
Twin piston-engined tractor aircraft